Choi Ran (born November 30, 1960) is a South Korean actress. She made her acting debut in 1979 and became best known as a supporting actress in television dramas, notably those written by the Hong sisters.

Choi married sportswriter and former basketball player Lee Chung-hee in 1984. They have one son Lee Jun-gi, and two daughters Lee Hyeon-gyeong and Lee Hyeon-jeong.

Filmography

Television series

Film

Variety show

Awards and nominations

References

External links 
  
  
 
 
 

1960 births
Living people
South Korean television actresses
South Korean film actresses
Chung-Ang University alumni